James Miller may refer to:

Military
James Miller (VC 1857) (1820–1892), Scottish recipient of the Victoria Cross in 1857
James Miller (Medal of Honor) (1836–1914), United States Civil War Medal of Honor recipient
Sir James Percy Miller, 2nd Baronet (1864–1906), British soldier and racehorse owner
James Miller (VC 1916) (1890–1916), English recipient of the Victoria Cross in 1916
James Blake Miller (born 1984), U.S. Iraq War veteran, known as "the Marlboro Man"
James Miller (general) (1776–1851), United States Army general and 1st governor of Arkansas Territory

Politics and government
James Miller (Newark politician), mayor of Newark, New Jersey 1838–1840 and 1848–1851
James F. Miller, mayor of New Orleans 1863–1864
James Francis Miller (1830–1902), U.S. Representative from Texas
James Andrews Miller (1839–1886), Canadian lawyer, judge and political figure in Manitoba
James Hughes Miller (1843-1890), Illinois legislator
James Monroe Miller (1852–1926), U.S. Representative from Kansas
James Rogers Miller Jr. (1931–2014). United States federal judge
James C. Miller III (born 1942), American politician and economist
James N. Miller (born 1959), American official in the Department of Defense
Sir James Miller (builder) (1905–1971), only person to serve both as Lord Provost of Edinburgh and Lord Mayor of London
James A. Miller (politician) (1883–1965), member of the California legislature

Science
 James A. Miller (biochemist) (1915–2000), American biochemist
 James Miller (surgeon) (1812–1864), medical author
 James Grier Miller (1916–2002), American biologist and pioneer of systems science
 James Q. Miller (1926–2005), American neurologist and educator
 James Paul Miller, American physicist
 James Douglas Miller (1937–1995), Scottish neurosurgeon
 James Gegan Miller (born 1942), American physicist

Sports
James Joy Miller (1886–1965), American football player
 James Miller (1910s footballer), Scottish footballer active in the 1910s
James Miller (1920s footballer), Scottish footballer active in the 1920s
James Miller (footballer, born 1904) (1904–?), Scottish footballer active in the 1930s
James Miller (pole vaulter) (born 1974), Australian pole vaulter
James Miller (cricketer) (born 1976), English cricketer
James Miller (basketball) (born 1979), American basketball player
James Miller (golfer), Scottish amateur golfer
James Jarrett Miller (1963–2002), American parachutist
Bub Miller (James "Bub" Miller), American baseball player

Entertainment
 James Andrew Miller, American investigative journalist and author of oral histories on ESPN and CAA
 James Miller (playwright) (1704–1744), English playwright, poet, librettist, and minister
 James Miller (parachutist) (1963–2002), known for his appearances at sporting events
 James Miller (filmmaker) (1968–2003), British filmmaker killed in the Gaza strip
 James Miller (novelist) (born 1976), British novelist and academic who wrote Lost Boys
 Ewan MacColl (James Henry Miller, 1915–1989), English singer-songwriter
 Cootie Stark (James Miller, 1927–2005), American Piedmont blues musician
 James Miller, reality TV show Survivor: Palau contestant in 2004–2005

Other
 James Weston Miller (1815–1888), American Presbyterian minister
 J. R. Miller (James Russell Miller, 1840–1912), Christian author and pastor
 James D. Miller (1830–1914), steamboat captain in the Pacific Northwest
 James Miller (architect) (1860–1947), Scottish architect
 James Rupert Miller (1869–1946), Canadian-born architect in San Francisco
 James Walter Miller (1890–1950), American citizen who was a spy for the Soviet Union
 James Miller (religious brother) (1944–1982), American Catholic teacher killed in Guatemala
 James E. Miller (1920–2010), American professor of English
 James Miller (academic) (born 1947), American professor of political science and pop culture
 James L. Miller Sr. (1897–1989), reporter for the Kansas City Star and Times
 James Miller, Australian serial killer who committed the Truro murders in 1976–1977

See also 
Jim Miller (disambiguation)
Jimmy Miller (disambiguation)
James Millar (disambiguation)
Jamie Miller (disambiguation)